Jevrem Grujić (November 8, 1827 – September 15, 1895) was a Serbian lawyer, politician and diplomat in the mid to late 19th century. Grujić was active at the highest levels of Serbian politics, contributing to the creation of new laws and a member of multiple cabinets. As a prominent ideologue of Serbian liberalism and member of the Academy of Sciences and Arts, he was frequently in conflict with the absolutist regime of Prince Mihailo Obrenović. Imprisoned a number of times during his career, popular support resulted in Grujić's release.

Early life and postgraduate studies 
Jevrem Grujić was born on 23 July 1826 in the village of Darosava near Arandjelovac in a patriarchal peasant family.  His father was a merchant and high ranking state official. His ancestors, originally from Montenegro, had moved to Serbia in the 17th century and founded a village of the same name. The founder of the Grujić family, Grujića Šestanović, was a participant in both Serbian insurrections and a deputy to the popular assembly that met during the first reign of Prince Miloš Obrenović. Following his graduation from the Gymnasium Grujić enrolled in the Lyceum in Belgrade in 1846.

In 1847 Jevrem Grujić with other Lyceum students founded the Society of Serbian Youth, which was inspired by the Burschenschaften.  In "", the almanac of Družina, Jevrem Grujić published an article titled: “Horizon of the State”. The article then became the statement of Serbian liberalism that Grujic's generation would eventually accept and adopt.

Grujić pointed out that the role of a country was to provide the people with happiness and wellbeing. He criticised the church, praised schools and education, expressed his faith in progress, and scorned the current atmosphere in Serbia. For him Serbs did not have outer or inner freedom since Serbia was still a vassal of the Ottoman Empire moreover it was deprived of any type of constitutional rights. The goals of his platform was the liberation of the Serbian people from foreign government, and the improvement of relations with other Slavs. Jevrem Grujić finished his text with the exclamation: “Long live an independent, legal, and in time, free state of Serbia.

In 1849 he was granted a government scholarship and proceeded to study law at two prestigious European universities: Heideberg and the Sorbonne.  In 1850 he moved to Paris to continue his studies, in France he published a book, that so enraged the Serbian authorities that they cancelled his stipend. He finished law school in 1854 and returned to Belgrade. He was one of the young liberal "Parisians" as were called those who had studied in France and were influenced by political doctrines of French provenance. In 1858, with Ranko Alimpić, Jovan Ilić, and others liberal students of the  lyceum, Grujić organized a "Liberal Club" where they advocated for national liberation and independence, freedom of the press, religion and education and professed the goal of modernising the Serb State economically and politically. Grujić joined the civil service, quickly progressing through the ranks.

Political career 
Jevrem Grujić was a central figure of the St Andrew's Day Assembly held in 1858 which later overthrew Prince Alexander Karađorđević. This marked his entry into politics and later on he was instrumental in passing Serbia's first law on the Assembly.

A founding member of the Liberal Party he served as its leader from 1868 to 1878. He served as minister in several Serbian governments and as head of Serbia's diplomatic missions in Constantinople, London and Paris.  His outspoken liberalism, however, brought him harassment and also imprisonment.

During the so-called "demise of the High Court", he was one of the five High Court judges (along with Jovan Filipović, Jovan Mičić, Marinko Radovanović, and Jovan Nikolić) who were sentenced to three years in prison and two years of deprivation of civil rights for discharging those associated with the Majstorović conspiracy. He was arrested at the beginning of July 1864 and released at the beginning of September 1865 after one year spent in the Karanovac prison, when Prince Mihailo Obrenović, under the strong pressure of the public opinion, pardoned him.

In 1876 Grujić became Minister of Justice in the Second Government of Stevča Mihailović.

In 1877, he was presented with the highest honour of his time, the Order of the Cross of Takovo 1st Class, and in 1892, towards the end of his diplomatic and political career, with the Order of the White Eagle 2nd Class while he was Serbian ambassador in Paris.

Jevrem Grujić died in Belgrade in 1895, His memoirs were published in three volumes by the Royal Serbian Academy in 1922–23.

Family and legacy
Jevrem and his wife Jelena had a son: Dr Slavko Grujić who received his doctorate at the Sorbonne in Paris, was Serbian Undersecretary for Foreign Affairs then a diplomat in Athens, Petrograd, ambassador in Washington and London where he died. He was married to American Mable Dunlop Grujić. She raised money and helped set up several aid funds for the Serbian soldiers fighting on the Salonika front. It was through the effort of Slavko and Mabel Grujić that the Belgrade University Library “Svetozar Marković” was built when Carnegie Endowment for International Peace agreed to approve a $100,000 gift to the Serbian government to build a "Carnegie library" in Belgrade.

For its remarkable cultural, historical, architectural and townscape value, Jevrem Grujić's House, an imposing single-story family villa, built-in neo-Renaissance style in 1896, was designated a cultural property in 1961, and a cultural property of great importance to the Republic of Serbia in 1979.

Published works 
  (1853)
  (Memories) (1864)
  (Writings) 3 vols., (1922–1923)

Notes

References

Further reading

 
 Srpski liberalizam u XIX veku”. Zbornik Matice srpske za istoriju 67/68 (2003), Branko Bešlin, 59–104.
 “Francuski uticaji u Srbiji 1835-1914: Četiri generacije Parizlija”. Zbornik Matice srpske za istoriju 56 (1997), 73–95.
 
 Jevrem Grujić, Zapisi Jevrema Grujića. Pred Svetoandrejsku skupštinu vol. I, (Belgrade: Srpska kraljevska akademija, 1922), pp. 130–131.
 "Government of Serbia: 1805-2005" Radoš Ljušić , 596 pages.  ., Published by the "Institute for Textbooks and Teaching Resources", Belgrade, 2005. COBISS.SR 124721676

External links
 Les premiers libéraux de Serbie : le cercle des “Parisiens” (in French)

1827 births
1895 deaths
Heidelberg University alumni
Serbian jurists
Government ministers of Serbia
Recipients of the Order of the Cross of Takovo
Serbian diplomats
19th-century diplomats
Serbian politicians
Interior ministers of Serbia
Justice ministers of Serbia